Wolfgang Alexander Albert Eduard Maximilian Reichsgraf Berghe von Trips (4 May 1928 – 10 September 1961), also known simply as Wolfgang Graf Berghe von Trips and nicknamed 'Taffy' by friends and fellow racers, was a German racing driver. He was the son of a noble Rhineland family.

Formula One and sports car driver

Von Trips was born in Cologne, Rhineland, Prussia, Germany. He had diabetes during his career and he always had high sugar snacks during the races to compensate for his low blood sugar levels.

He participated in 29 Formula One World Championship Grand Prix races, debuting on 2 September 1956. He won two races, secured one pole position, achieved six podiums, and scored a total of 56 championship points.

He sustained a concussion when he spun off track at the Nürburgring during trial runs for a sports car race held in May 1957. His Ferrari was destroyed. It was the only one of its marque to be entered in the Gran Turismo car class of more than 1600 cc. Von Trips was forced out of a Royal Automobile Club Grand Prix at Silverstone, in July 1958, when his Ferrari came into the pits on the 60th lap with no oil. The following August he was fifth at Porto in the 1958 Portuguese Grand Prix, which was won by Stirling Moss in a Vanwall. Von Trips completed 49 laps and was one lap behind at the finish. Moss was more than five minutes ahead of Mike Hawthorn, who finished second in a Ferrari.

In July 1960 von Trips was victorious in a Formula Two event in a Ferrari, with a newly introduced engine in the rear. The race was in Stuttgart and was called the Solitude Formula Two Grand Prix. He won the Targa Florio, 10-lap  race, in May 1961.
as his co-driver. Von Trips and Phil Hill traded the lead at Spa, Belgium during the 1961 Belgian Grand Prix, in June 1961. Hill led most of the way in front of a crowd of 100,000 people.

Ferraris captured the first four places at the race conclusion with von Trips finishing second. The Formula One World Championship driver competition at this juncture in 1961 was led by Hill with 19 points followed by von Trips with 18.

In 1961 von Trips established a go-kart race track in Kerpen, Germany. The track was later leased by Rolf Schumacher, whose sons, Michael and Ralf, made their first laps there.

Death
The 1961 Italian Grand Prix on 10 September saw von Trips tightly locked in the battle for the Formula One World Drivers' Championship that year with his teammate Phil Hill. During the race at Monza, his Ferrari collided with Jim Clark's Lotus. His car became airborne and crashed into a side barrier, fatally throwing von Trips from the car, and killing fifteen spectators.

Clark described the accident, saying:

"Von Trips and I were racing along the straightaway and were nearing one of the banked curves, the one on the southern end. We were about 100 metres from the beginning of the curve. Von Trips was running close to the inside of the track. I was closely following him, keeping near the outside. At one point Von Trips shifted sideways so that my front wheels collided with his back wheels. It was the fatal moment. Von Trips's car spun twice and went into the guardrail along the inside of the track. Then it bounced back, struck my own car and bounced down into the crowd."

Movie footage of the crash that surfaced after the race showed that Clark's memory of the incident was inaccurate: after colliding with Clark, von Trips's car rode directly up an embankment on the outside of the track and struck a fence behind which spectators were closely packed.

At the time of his death von Trips was leading the Formula One World Championship. He had previous incidents at the Autodromo Nazionale Monza, where he crashed cars in the 1956 Italian Grand Prix and the 1958 Italian Grand Prix, and was injured in both events.

Racing record

Complete Formula One World Championship results
(key) (Races in bold indicate pole position)

* Indicates shared drive with Cesare Perdisa and Peter Collins† Indicates shared drive with Mike Hawthorn

Formula One Non-Championship results
(key) (Races in bold indicate pole position)
(Races in italics indicate fastest lap)

See also
 La Passione (1996 film)

References

Terminology note
 Regarding personal names, Graf is a German title, translated as Count, not a first or middle name. The feminine form is Gräfin.

Further reading

External links 
 Film – Wolfgang Graf Berghe von Trips zwischen Rittergut und Rennstrecke

1928 births
1961 deaths
24 Hours of Le Mans drivers
Sportspeople from Cologne
Counts of Germany
Ferrari Formula One drivers
Formula One race winners
Filmed deaths in motorsport
German Formula One drivers
German racing drivers
People from the Rhine Province
Porsche Formula One drivers
Racing drivers from North Rhine-Westphalia
Racing drivers who died while racing
Scuderia Centro Sud Formula One drivers
Sport deaths in Italy
Waldorf school alumni
World Sportscar Championship drivers